Area code 239 is a telephone area code in the North American Numbering Plan (NANP) for a large part of Southwestern Florida. The numbering plan area includes Lee and Collier counties, small parts of Hendry and Charlotte counties and the Everglades National Park in Mainland Monroe County. The area code was created on March 11, 2002, in an area code split in which the southern half of area code 941, from North Fort Myers, was renumbered with 239. A permissive dialing period ended on March 10, 2003.

Service area

 Marco Island
 Fort Myers
 Cape Coral
 Naples
 Golden Gate City
 Golden Gate Estates
 Lehigh Acres
 North Fort Myers
 Estero
 Bonita Springs
 Saint James City
 Pine Island
 Sanibel
 Captiva
 Alva
 Immokalee

See also
List of Florida area codes
List of North American Numbering Plan area codes

References

External links
Florida's Area Code History

Telecommunications-related introductions in 2003
239
239
2003 establishments in Florida